Helman Tor is a granite hill in mid Cornwall, UK with several separated tors, and is designated as a (non-statutory) County Geology Site (with similar criteria  to a County Wildlife Site). The hill also has a Scheduled Ancient Monument. Helman Tor is also the name of the nature reserve managed by the Cornwall Wildlife Trust which includes Breney Common (a Special Area of Conservation) and Red Moor. Helman Tor, along with Breney Common, Red Moor and Belowda Beacon, is part of the Mid Cornwall Moors  Site of Special Scientific Interest.
It lies on the Saints' Way, a long-distance footpath completed in 1986.

It is the northern end of a granite ridge.  There are at least three rocking stones (logan stone) on the ridge.

There is a prehistoric hill fort and a stone hut circle settlement on the site.
There is evidence of walls constructed in Neolithic period, around 6,000 years ago, as well as some level platforms, thought to be house sites, one platform has a network of postholes. There is also remains of a field system. These are similar to those at Carn Brea and limited excavation was carried out by Roger Mercer.

There is a second Logan stone in the highest pile beside the trig point (triangulation point). A third logan stone is further down the ridge to the south, outside the reserve.

References

External links

Access to Monuments - Helman Tor
Helman Tor at UKClimbing.com

Hills of Cornwall
Nature reserves of the Cornwall Wildlife Trust